Berrigan may refer to:

People with the surname 
 Australian (sibling) rugby players:
 Barry Berrigan (born 1975)
 Shaun Berrigan (born 1978)
 Ted Berrigan (1934 – 1983), poet
 American (sibling) activist priests:
 Philip Berrigan (1923 - 2002)
 Daniel Berrigan (1921 - 2016)

Australian botany and places 
 Plants:
 Eremophila longifolia
 Pittosporum angustifolium
 Places in New South Wales:
 Berrigan, New South Wales, town
 Berrigan Shire, local government area (which contains Berrigan)